Steven Sedgewon Jones Jr. (born February 1, 1999) is an American football defensive back for the Appalachian State Mountaineers.

Early life
Jones was born on February 1, 1999, in Rockingham, North Carolina. He attended Richmond Senior High School where he made 35 tackles and three interceptions as a senior, earning all-conference honors. He was rated a two-star cornerback by 247Sports and Scout.com.

College career
Jones committed to Appalachian State University, spending his first season as a redshirt. In his second year, 2018, he appeared in 13 games, mainly on special teams. In a 72–7 win over Gardner–Webb, he blocked two punts and returned one for his first career touchdown. His performance earned him Sun Belt Conference Special Team Player of the Week honors. He made five tackles in the season.

As a sophomore in 2019, Jones started two games and appeared in a total of 13, making seven tackles. He played in every games in the following season, being the third cornerback on the team's depth chart. He returned interceptions for 97 total yards and scored a touchdown against Troy. He also served as the Appalachian State kick returner, averaging 21.9 yards per return.

As a senior in 2021, Jones appeared in all 14 games and started all but one. He made 51 tackles and ranked top 20 in the nation for passes defended with 13. In a game against Arkansas State, he made three interceptions and returned two for touchdowns, earning the Walter Camp and Bronko Nagurski awards for best defensive player of the week. He placed second in the nation and first in his conference with five interceptions on the year, and was first nationally in interceptions returned for touchdowns. At the end of the year, Jones was named first-team All-American by the Football Writers Association of America. He was also a first-team all-conference selection.

References

1999 births
Living people
American football defensive backs
People from Rockingham, North Carolina
Appalachian State Mountaineers football players
Players of American football from North Carolina